Senator Dole may refer to:

 Bob Dole (1923–2021), U.S. Senator from Kansas from 1969 to 1996 and husband of Elizabeth Dole.
 Elizabeth Dole (born 1936), U.S. Senator from North Carolina from 2003 to 2009 and wife of Bob Dole.

See also
John J. Doles (1895–1970), Louisiana State Senate